Jeong Ki-ryong (1562–1622) was a prominent Korean Army general during the Joseon Dynasty. He fought against the Japanese invasions of Korea (1592–1598) (Seven Years' War), and won the battles of Geochang and Geumsan. He was one of those who recaptured the Sangju castle, captured the Japancese general in Goryeong, and recaptured Seongju, Hapcheon, Uiryeong, Kyungju and Ulsan.

Jeong Ki-ryong was born in Jinju, South Gyeongsang Province in 1562. His original name was Jeong Mu-su (정무수; 鄭茂壽). He was the son of Jeong Ho, Fourth State Councillor (Jwachanseong 좌찬성). In 1586, he passed the military examination (무과; 武科) and renamed Ki-ryong by the King's command.

In 1590, he got to serve as a drill instructor under the Shin Rip, Commander of the Right Gyeongsangdo. When the war broke in 1592, he got promoted to manager, starting to serve under the Cho Gyeong, Marshal of the Right Gyeongsangdo.

At that time, he has recommended to General Cho Gyeong a scheme to check an advance of Japanese army, as a consequence of complying his artifice, they have destroyed 500 of Japanese army in a Battle of Geochang.

He has jumped in the Battle of Geumsan and saved Cho Gyeong who was captured by Japanese army as a prisoner of war.

After then he defended against the Japanese armies' attack at Jeolla province as appointed as the Lord of Gonyang. In succession, after he was appointed the lord of Sangju which was lost by the Japanese army, he reseized that castle of Sangju by fighting with that Japanese army.

As soon as the second war broke out against the Japan in 1597, his Joseon army broke the Japanese army Goryeong and captured the chief of the Japanese army alive. In succession, he reseized many castles such as Seongju, Hapcheon, Chogye, Uiryeong, Kyungju and Ulsan and then was promoted to Commander of the Right Gyeongsangdo.

After he had led the Joseon-Ming combined forces in the year 1598, he swept the remnants of the defeated Japanese army in the areas of Gyeongsang provinces.

General Jeong kept staying in Gyeongsang provinces and prepared to prevent the reinvasion of the Japan, though the war against the Japan ended in the year 1601.

He was promoted as a field marshal (Sanghogun 상호군) in 1610, and after that as an admiral of the fleet he undertook the naval commander of the Three Provinces (Samdo Sugun Tongjesa 삼도수군통제사) and died in camp of Tongyeong in 1622.

17th-century Korean people
Korean generals
1562 births
1622 deaths
16th-century Korean people
People of the Japanese invasions of Korea (1592–1598)